Cyril Bernard Papali (1902–1981), also known as Fr. Cyril Bernard of the Mother of God OCD, was an Indian priest, theologian, writer, academic and a Peritus at the Vatican II. A priest belonging to the O.C.D. (Order of Carmel Discalced) of Manjummel Province in Kerala, Papali was known for his scholarship in Christian as well as Indian theologies and wrote a number of books on these subjects.

Biography 
Cyril Bernard Papali was born in Kara, in the south Indian state of Kerala on 26 September 1902. After opting the Third Order Discalced Carmelite (T.OCD) of the Archdiocese of Verapoly as the base of his vocation on 15 May 1924, he completed his vocational studies to be ordained as a priest on 30 May 1931. Eventually, he became the Prior General of the Congregation, a position he held until 1950, when he was called to Rome where he taught Hinduism at the Pontifical Urban University. He worked at the university till his retirement in 1972. In between, he was a Peritus at the Second Vatican Council on the question of laity which was in session from 1962 to 1965 and served as a Consultant of Vatican Secretariat for Non-Christians in 1964.

Papali wrote several books and articles in the fields of theology, philosophy and religion. His book, Hinduism: Religion and Philosophy is considered by many scholars as a classical work in Latin language written by an Indian. The Advaita Vedanta of Sankaracarya, a two-volume treatise on the Advaita philosophy of Adi Shankara is another of his known books on Hinduism. He has also written a book on Mary, mother of Jesus under the title, Mother of God: Mary in Scripture and tradition,

Papali died on 14 September 1981, aged 78 at the Pontifical Theological Faculty and Pontifical Institute of Spirituality Teresianum in Rome.

Selected publications

See also

 Roman Catholicism in India
 Saint Thomas Christians
 Alphonsa of the Immaculate Conception
 Antony Thachuparambil

References

Further reading 
 
 How Does the Christian Confront the Old Testament? by Pierre Benoit, Cyril Papali et al. Paulist Press, Glen Rock, New Jersey, 1968. Volume 030.
 The funeral rites of the Hindus / by Cyril Papali
 Excursus on Hinduism Commentary on the Documents of Vatican II. / by Cyril Papali. Vol. 3. Ed. Herbert Vorgrimler, New York: Herder and Herder, 1969, 137–144.

External links 
 
 
 
 

Indian Eastern Catholics
1902 births
1981 deaths
Carmelites
People from Kochi
Christian clergy from Kerala
Indian writers
Second Vatican Council
Roman Catholic theologians
Indian theologians
Indian religion academics
Malayali people
Academic staff of the Pontifical Urban University